Archduke Maximilian Francis of Austria (Maximilian Franz Xaver Joseph Johann Anton de Paula Wenzel; 8 December 1756 – 26 July 1801) was Elector of Cologne and Grand Master of the Teutonic Knights. He was the youngest child of Holy Roman Empress Maria Theresa and Holy Roman Emperor Francis I. He was the last fully functioning Elector of Cologne and the second employer and patron of the young Ludwig van Beethoven.

Biography

Maximilian Francis was born December 8, 1756, on his father’s 48th birthday, in the Hofburg Palace, Vienna. In 1780, he succeeded his uncle Prince Charles Alexander of Lorraine as Hochmeister (Grand Master) of the Deutscher Orden (Teutonic Knights).

In 1784, he became Archbishop and Elector of Cologne, living in the Electoral Palace, Bonn. He remained in that office until his death in exile. In his capacity as chancellor of the Holy Roman Empire for Italy and as the Pope's deputy he crowned as Emperor in Frankfurt first his brother Leopold II in 1790, and in 1792 his nephew Francis II.

At the same time as he became Elector of Cologne, Maximilian Francis was elected to the related Bishopric of Münster and held court in Bonn, as the Archbishop-Electors of Cologne had been forced to do since the late Middle Ages. A keen patron of music, Maximilian Francis maintained a court musical establishment in which Beethoven's father was a tenor, thus playing an important role in the son's early career as a member of the same musical body of which his grandfather, also named Ludwig van Beethoven, had been Kapellmeister.

The court organist, Christian Gottlob Neefe, was Beethoven's early mentor and teacher. Recognising his young pupil's gift both as a performer and as a composer, Neefe brought Beethoven to the court, advising Maximilian Francis to appoint him as assistant organist. Maximilian Francis, too, recognised the extraordinary abilities of the young Beethoven. In 1787, he gave Beethoven leave to visit Vienna to become a pupil of Mozart, but the visit was cut short by news of the last illness of Beethoven's mother, and evidence is lacking for any contact with Mozart.

In 1792, the Redoute was opened, making Godesberg a spa town. Beethoven played in the orchestra. After a concert given there in the presence of Joseph Haydn, another visit for studies in Vienna was planned. Beethoven went on full salary to Vienna to study with Haydn, Antonio Salieri and others. The Elector maintained an interest in the young Beethoven's progress, and several reports from Haydn to Maximilian detailing it are extant. The prince anticipated that Beethoven would return to Bonn and continue working for him, but due to the subsequent political and military situation his subject never returned, choosing to pursue a career in Vienna.

Maximilian Francis's rule over most of the Electorate ended in 1794, when his domains were overrun by the troops of Revolutionary France. During the French Revolutionary Wars, Cologne and Bonn were both occupied by the French army in the second half of 1794. As the French approached, Maximilian Francis left Bonn, as it turned out never to return, and his territories on the left bank of the Rhine eventually passed to France under the terms of the Treaty of Lunéville (1801). The Archbishop's court ceased to exist. Although Maximilian Francis still retained his territories on the right bank of the Rhine, including Münster and the Duchy of Westphalia, the Elector, grossly corpulent and plagued by ill health, took up residence in Vienna after the loss of his capital and remained there until his death at the age of 44, at Hetzendorf Palace in 1801. The dismantling of the court made Beethoven's relocation to Vienna permanent, and his stipend was terminated.

Beethoven planned to dedicate his First Symphony to his former patron, but the latter died before it was completed.

The Electorate of Cologne was secularised in the course of the German mediatisation of 1802–1803.

Ancestry

References

 "Who Died? The Funeral March in Beethoven’s Eroica Symphony" The Musical Quarterly Summer 2007. Accessed 2 October 2008.

External links 

 Marie Gossip | Archduke Maximilian Franz of Austria tells the Princes of the Blood what he really thinks

1756 births
1801 deaths
18th-century Austrian people
19th-century Austrian people
Nobility from Vienna
Archbishop-Electors of Cologne
Austrian Roman Catholics
Prince-Bishops of Münster
Grand Masters of the Teutonic Order
House of Habsburg-Lorraine
Knights of the Golden Fleece of Austria
Grand Crosses of the Order of Saint Stephen of Hungary
People from Innere Stadt
Austrian princes
Children of Maria Theresa
Burials at the Imperial Crypt
Burials at St. Stephen's Cathedral, Vienna
Sons of emperors
Sons of kings